Eduard Trippel (born 26 March 1997) is a German judoka. He won the silver medal in the men's 90 kg event at the 2020 Summer Olympics in Tokyo, Japan. He also won one of the bronze medals in the mixed team event. He competed at the World Judo Championships in 2018, 2019 and 2021.

He competed in the men's 90 kg and men's team events at the 2017 European Judo Championships held in Warsaw, Poland. In 2020, he competed in the men's 90 kg event at the European Judo Championships held in Prague, Czech Republic.

In 2021, he won one of the bronze medals in his event at the Judo World Masters held in Doha, Qatar.

References

External links

 
 
 

Living people
1997 births
People from Rüsselsheim
Sportspeople from Darmstadt (region)
German male judoka
Judoka at the 2019 European Games
European Games competitors for Germany
Olympic judoka of Germany
Judoka at the 2020 Summer Olympics
Medalists at the 2020 Summer Olympics
Olympic medalists in judo
Olympic silver medalists for Germany
Olympic bronze medalists for Germany
21st-century German people